is Ai Otsuka's seventh single. It was released on 9 February 2005, by Avex Trax. The title is roughly translated as "680 yen salty grilled black Japanese beef tongue."

The song was used as ending theme for TV Tokyo's 2005 anime series Black Jack. This single sold 149,134 copies and it became the #68 best selling single of 2005. The b-sides included on the maxi single are all related to meat types with its respective prices.

Background
"Kuroge Wagyuu" is a rock version of "Kuroge Wagyu... 735 En" on her Love Jam album. It features a part of the chorus at the beginning a cappella before going into rock instrumentals. "Hon Maguro" is a jazz track, featuring heartbeats and a jazz band. "Tsukune" is a hard post-grunge song that has Ai's vocals masked after the intro. The intro is a simple 30-second piano ballad before going right into the song. This song sparked some discussion into what she could be actually saying, because the beginning's lyrics was open to discussion for sexually suggestive lyrics.  This arguably is Ai's most daring single, seeing as all of the song's lyrics were sexually suggestive, or sexual innuendos as in "Tsukune".

Music video
The music video for "Kuroge" was also sexually suggestive, as it featured Ai in a black dress in a restaurant trying to seduce a man (portrayed by Kou Takasugi) by feeding him. It features her in a restaurant with the man, her barefoot sitting in a room full of sparkling objects and then her in a bright blue fuzzy shag room. It goes between those scenes in that order until at the end, when Ai gets the man to come into her bright blue room, only for him to eat her food and fall through a strange hole.

Track listing

References
  

2005 singles
Ai Otsuka songs
2005 songs
Songs written by Ai Otsuka
Song recordings produced by Max Matsuura
Avex Trax singles